Bekirloja is a village in North Macedonia in the Lozovo Municipality.  It is the setting of the Academy Award-nominated documentary film Honeyland, which depicts it as an abandoned village with no electricity and inhabited by one, and then two families. 

As of the 2021 census, Bekirloja had 1 resident with the following ethnic composition:
Turks 1

References

Lozovo Municipality
Municipalities of North Macedonia
Azerbaijani Turkish exonyms